In quantum information theory and quantum optics, the Schrödinger–HJW theorem is a result about the realization of a mixed state of a quantum system as an ensemble of pure quantum states and the relation between the corresponding purifications of the density operators. The theorem is named after physicists and mathematicians Erwin Schrödinger, Lane P. Hughston, Richard Jozsa and William Wootters. The result was also found independently (albeit partially) by Nicolas Gisin, and by Nicolas Hadjisavvas building upon work by Ed Jaynes, while a significant part of it was likewise independently discovered by N. David Mermin. Thanks to its complicated history, it is also known by various other names such as the GHJW theorem, the HJW theorem, and the purification theorem.

Purification of a mixed quantum state 

Any such  can be purified, that is, represented as the partial trace of a pure state defined in a larger Hilbert space. More precisely, it is always possible to find a (finite-dimensional) Hilbert space  and a pure state  such that . Furthermore, the states  satisfying this are all and only those of the form for some orthonormal basis . The state  is then referred to as the "purification of ". Since the auxiliary space and the basis can be chosen arbitrarily, the purification of a mixed state is not unique; in fact, there are infinitely many purifications of a given mixed state. Because all of them admit a decomposition in the form given above, given any pair of purifications , there is always some unitary operation  such that

Theorem 

There will be two corresponding purifications of the mixed state  reading as follows:

Purification 1: ;
Purification 2: .

These two purifications only differ by a unitary transformation acting on the auxiliary space, viz., there exists a unitary matrix such that . Therefore, which means that we can realize the different ensembles of a mixed state just by making different measurements on the purifying system.

References 

Quantum information theory